PP-115 Faisalabad-XIX is a Constituency of Provincial Assembly of Punjab.

See also
 PP-114 Faisalabad-XVIII
 PP-116 Faisalabad-XX

References

External links
 Election commission Pakistan's official website
 Awazoday.com check result
 Official Website of Government of Punjab

Constituencies of Punjab, Pakistan